Ovseyev (masculine) or Ovseyeva (feminine) is a Russian last name, a variant of Yevseyev. The following people bear this last name:
Robbie Ovseev (Ovseyev), rugby player who participated in the 2011 Canterbury-Bankstown Bulldogs season

See also
Ovseyevo, a rural locality (a village) in Ostrovsky District of Pskov Oblast, Russia

References

Notes

Sources
И. М. Ганжина (I. M. Ganzhina). "Словарь современных русских фамилий" (Dictionary of Modern Russian Last Names). Москва, 2001. 

Russian-language surnames
